Achaea occidens is a species of moth of the family Erebidae first described by George Hampson in 1913. It is found in Ghana, the Democratic Republic of the Congo, Ivory Coast, the Gambia and Sierra Leone.

References

Achaea (moth)
Erebid moths of Africa
Lepidoptera of West Africa
Moths described in 1913